Christos Titas (born 21 November 1968) is a Greek cross-country skier. He competed at the 1988 Winter Olympics and the 1994 Winter Olympics.

References

External links
 

1968 births
Living people
Greek male cross-country skiers
Olympic cross-country skiers of Greece
Cross-country skiers at the 1988 Winter Olympics
Cross-country skiers at the 1994 Winter Olympics
Sportspeople from Florina